Nicoleta is a Romanian feminine given name derived from the Greek Nikolaos. Notable people with this name include the following:

 Nicoleta Alexandru, singer who represented Romania at the Eurovision Song Contest 2003 
 Nicoleta Grasu, Romanian discus thrower
 Nicoleta Onel, Romanian gymnast
 Nicoleta Daniela Șofronie, artistic gymnast

See also

 Nikoleta (disambiguation)
 Nicoletta (disambiguation)

References

Romanian feminine given names